Euphorbia quitensis is a species of plant in the family Euphorbiaceae. It is endemic to Ecuador.  Its natural habitat is subtropical or tropical moist montane forests.

References

quitensis
Endemic flora of Ecuador
Critically endangered flora of South America
Taxonomy articles created by Polbot
Taxa named by Pierre Edmond Boissier